Lühburg is a village and a former municipality  in the Rostock district, in Mecklenburg-Vorpommern, Germany. Since May 2019, it is part of the municipality Walkendorf.

References

Grand Duchy of Mecklenburg-Schwerin
Former municipalities in Mecklenburg-Western Pomerania